Hello Again is a musical with music, lyrics and book by Michael John LaChiusa.  It is based on the 1897 play La Ronde by Arthur Schnitzler (also titled Reigen).  It focuses on a series of love affairs among ten characters during the ten different decades of the 20th century.

The musical premiered Off-Broadway in 1993, directed and choreographed by Graciela Daniele.  Since then it has been performed in London, Sweden, Australia, Germany, The Netherlands and New York.

Adaptation and plot 
LaChuisa's musical adaptation follows the structure of Schnitzler's original material closely, often replicating fragments of his dialogue, detailing a daisy chain of sexual encounters and love affairs among ten characters in ten scenes. His innovation, however, was to set each scene of the musical in a different decade of the 20th century and in a non-chronological order, allowing for a huge variety of musical style and pastische ranging from opera to 1970s disco while simultaneously introducing musical and lyrical echoes throughout to tie all the characters and their experiences together.  He also altered the gender of Schnitzler's "Little Miss" to the sexually ambiguous "Young Thing" to introduce a homosexual element into his century of sexual congress.

Highlights of the score include "I Got A Little Time", "Tom", "Safe", "The One I Love", "Mistress of the Senator" and "The Bed Was Not My Own".

Production history 
The musical premiered Off-Broadway at the Mitzi E. Newhouse Theater (at Lincoln Center) on December 30, 1993 in previews and closed on March 27, 1994, after 101 performances.  Directed and musically staged by Graciela Daniele, the show was much in the vein of Stephen Sondheim's Sunday in the Park with George in that the staging was like a classic painting coming to life. It received eight Drama Desk Award nominations including Best Musical, three for LaChiusa (Outstanding Book of a Musical, Music and Lyrics categories), two for Daniele (Choreographer and Director categories) and nominations for actors Judy Blazer, John Cameron Mitchell and Donna Murphy. The original cast album was released in 1994 by RCA Victor.

The musical received its professional European premiere in 2001 at London's Bridewell Theatre, as part of a series of musicals introducing the works of the next generation of major American musical theatre writers.  It was directed by the theatre's co-Artistic Director Clive Paget with musical direction by Christopher Frost with a cast that featured Jenna Russell, Matt Rawle, Charles Shirvell and Nigel Richards.  There were minor changes made to the score in this production as well as a substantial rewrite to "Scene 8" (The Writer and the Actress) overseen by the composer.

In 2007, the musical received a controversial showing by The Satori Group at The Hustler Sound Stage,  a building in Cincinnati that was once the headquarters for Hustler magazine, when publisher Larry Flynt was a local celebrity during the 1970s.

Also in 2007, "Hello Again" premiered in Germany, at the Akademietheater im Prinzregententheater Munich. The production was directed by Silvia Armbruster with musical direction by Philip Tillotson, and the text was translated by Roman Hinze.

In May 2008, it was given its Scandinavian premiere in Gothenburg and Borås in Sweden in a production directed by Vernon Mound with musical direction by Derek Barnes and choreography by Cynthia Kai. The production used the revisions made for the London version and the text was translated by Fredrik Fischer and Linnea Sjunnesson together with members of the cast.

The Transport Group presented the first New York City revival, opening on March 19, 2011 through April 3. This production features new orchestrations by Mary-Mitchell Campbell and was staged non-traditionally in a raw space in SoHo by Jack Cummings III.

"Hello Again" was revived at the Union Theatre, London, opening in September 2019. This new production was directed by Paul Callen, musical direction and orchestrations by Henry Brennan, choreography by Genevieve Leeney, costume design by Reuben Speed, lighting design by Ben Bull, production photography by Mark Senior, casting by Adam Braham, and produced by Sasha Regan with associate producer, Maison Kelley.

Cast lists 

1993 Original off-Broadway cast
The Whore - Donna Murphy
The Soldier - David A. White
The Nurse - Judy Blazer
The College Boy - Michael Park
The Young Wife - Carolee Carmello
The Husband - Dennis Parlato
The Young Thing - John Cameron Mitchell
The Writer - Malcolm Gets
The Actress - Michele Pawk
The Senator - John Dossett

2001 London cast
The Whore - Ellen O'Grady
The Soldier - Matt Rawle
The Nurse - Golda Rosheuvel
The College Boy - Mark Stobbard
The Young Wife - Jenna Russell
The Husband - Charles Shirvell
The Young Thing - Dominic Brewer
The Writer - Michael Cahill
The Actress - Anita Louise Combe
The Senator - Nigel Richards

2006 Australian Cast
The Whore - Sophie Carter
The Soldier - Paul Biencourt
The Nurse - Jodie Harris
The College Boy - Chris Purcell
The Young Wife - Monique Pitsikas
The Husband - Barry Mitchell
The Young Thing - Leon Bryant
The Writer - Matt Heyward
The Actress- Taneel Van Zyl
The Senator - David Spencer

2008 Scandinavian cast
The Whore - Lena Näslund
The Soldier - Jonas Schlyter
The Nurse - Hilde Traetteberg
The College Boy - Mikael Lundin
The Young Wife - Mari Haugen Smistad
The Husband - Tore Norrby
The Young Thing - David Inghamn	
The Writer - Johan Ringström 
The Actress - Maria Camilla Karlsson Stavland
The Senator - Lennart Eriksson	

2008 Australian Cast
 The Whore- Lisa Callingham
 The Soldier- Vincent Hooper
 The Nurse- Liz Stiles
The College Boy- Keane Fletcher
The Young Wife- Katrina Retallick
The Husband- Matt Young
The Young Thing- Gareth Keegan
The Writer- Zack Curran
The Actress- Sigrid Langford-Scherf
The Senator- Nathan Carter

2011 off-Broadway Revival Cast
The Whore - Nikka Graff Lanzarone
The Soldier - Max von Essen
The Nurse - Elizabeth Stanley
The College Boy - Robert Lenzi
The Young Wife - Alexandra Silber
The Husband - Bob Stillman
The Young Thing - Blake Daniel
The Writer - Jonathan Hammond
The Actress - Rachel Bay Jones
The Senator - Alan Campbell

2017 Film
The Whore - Sam Underwood
The Soldier - Nolan Gerard Funk
The Nurse - Jenna Ushkowitz
The College Boy - Al Calderon
The Young Wife - Rumer Willis
The Husband - T. R. Knight
The Young Thing - Tyler Blackburn
The Writer - Cheyenne Jackson
The Actress - Audra McDonald
The Senator - Martha Plimpton

2019 Off-West End/London Revival Cast
The Whore - Ellen O'Grady
The Soldier - Jack Rowell
The Nurse - Alice Ellen Wright
The College Boy - Regan Burke
The Young Wife - Grace Roberts
The Husband - Keith Merrill
The Young Thing - Phillip Murch
The Writer - George Whitty
The Actress - Amy Parker
The Senator - David Pendlebury

Scenes and musical numbers 
The Whore and the Soldier - Hello Again
The Soldier and the Nurse - Zei Gezent / I Gotta Little Time / We Kiss
The Nurse and the College Boy - In Some Other Life
The College Boy and the Young Wife - Story of My Life
The Young Wife and the Husband - At the Prom / Ah Maein Zeit / Tom
The Husband and the Young Thing - Listen to the Music
The Young Thing and the Writer - Montage / Safe / The One I Love
The Writer and the Actress - Silent Movie
The Actress and the Senator - Rock With Rock / Angel of Mercy / Mistress of the Senator
The Senator and the Whore - The Bed Was Not My Own / Hello Again (Reprise)

Film 

The stage musical has been adapted to film, which is directed by Tom Gustafson and written by Cory Krueckeberg. Filming began in December 2015 and had a limited release in the United States on November 8, 2017.

References

External links 
Hello Again at Lortel Database 
Listing at guidetomusicaltheatre.com
The Lincoln Center, New York
Roman Hinze, Translator of the German version
Hello, Again on Floormic.com

1994 musicals
Off-Broadway musicals
West End musicals
Musicals based on plays
LGBT-related musicals